Heffron is an electoral district of the Legislative Assembly in the Australian state of New South Wales. It is named after Robert Heffron, a former Labor premier of New South Wales. It is a safe  seat, currently represented by Ron Hoenig of the Labor Party since August 2012. Created in 1973 from the abolished seat of Cook's River, the seat was represented from 2003 to 2012 by former New South Wales Premier Kristina Keneally of the Labor Party. At the 2011 election, Keneally suffered a swing of over 16 percent, more than halving her majority from 23 percent to seven percent. She resigned the seat on 29 June 2012 to start her new career as CEO of Basketball Australia, prompting an August Heffron by-election. At the by-election, Ron Hoenig won with 70 percent of the two-candidate preferred vote.

Heffron includes the suburbs of Alexandria, Beaconsfield, Centennial Park, Erskineville, Kensington, Kingsford, Mascot, Moore Park, Rosebery, St Peters, Sydenham, Tempe, Waterloo, Zetland and parts of Eastlakes, Randwick and The University of NSW.  Sydney (Kingsford Smith) Airport is located within the electorate. The district was named after Bob Heffron who was the local MP for Botany and Maroubra. The seat was contested for the first time in the year 1973, won by Laurie Brereton and has always been held by the Labor party.

Members for Heffron

Election results

References

Heffron
1973 establishments in Australia
Constituencies established in 1973